Epiphthora leucomichla is a moth of the family Gelechiidae. It was described by Edward Meyrick in 1904. It is found in Australia, where it has been recorded from Tasmania and New South Wales.

The forewings are shining white, with some scattered fuscous or dark fuscous scales and an outwardly oblique bar from the middle of the dorsum reaching halfway across the wing, a spot on the tornus, a spot on the costa at three-fourths, and an ochreous-fuscous terminal suffusion towards the apex, or indicated by dark fuscous irroration (sprinkling) only. The hindwings are grey.

References

Moths described in 1904
Epiphthora
Taxa named by Edward Meyrick